Að brunnum (By the Spring) is a 1974 poetry collection by Icelandic poet Ólafur Jóhann Sigurðsson. It won the Nordic Council's Literature Prize in 1976.

References

1974 poetry books
Icelandic poetry
Nordic Council's Literature Prize-winning works
Poetry collections